The 2018 Indonesian Movie Actors Awards was the 12th annual Indonesian Movie Actors Awards show that was held at studio 14 MNC Studios, Jakarta and was organised by RCTI. Daniel Mananta and Nirina Zubir hosted this event and the event was attended by the CEO of MNC Group, Hary Tanoesoedibjo. This event was postponed from May to July, due to a collision with Eid al-Fitr.

In this awards show, the film Dilan 1990 succeeded in becoming the Favorite Film of the Viewers' Choice. This film, along with the film Marlina the Murderer in Four Acts  managed to achieve 3 awards and become the films with the most wins this year.

Judges

Presenters

Winners and nominees

Best
Winners are listed first and highlighted in boldface.

Favourite
Winners are listed first and highlighted in boldface.

Lifetime Achievement and Special Awards 
The Lifetime Achievement award is given to the person who is considered the most dedicated to the world of Indonesian cinema that year. This year the award is given to a senior actor, Adi Kurdi for his dedication and totality in Indonesian cinema.
In addition, this year the Special Awards were also given to Amoroso Katamsi and Deddy Sutomo.

References

External links 
 

Indonesian
2018 in Indonesia
Indonesian Movie Actor Awards